"Rock 'n' Roll Winter (Loony's Tune)" was a song written by Roy Wood.  It was released by the British rock band Wizzard, as their first single on the Warner Bros label in 1974. It was originally meant to be issued early in 1974 but the date was pushed back to 29 March 1974, before it was finally released on 19 April that year. Nevertheless, it sold well and reached number 6 on the UK Singles Chart, and number 13 on the Irish Singles Chart. 

The song is dedicated to Roy Wood's girlfriend at the time Lynsey de Paul (aka Loony, from Spike Milligan's nickname for her, Looney de Small) with lyrics such as "Almost every song I dream of in the end, I could dedicate to you my lovely friend" and "But now your friendly music keeps me warm each night". On the record label under the title of the song is the text "Sorry the word "Spring" wouldn't fit". The backing vocals are credited to "Loony", "The Bleach Boys" and "The Suedettes". Although it was not included on the 1974 album Introducing Eddy and the Falcons, it was a bonus track on the CD version released in 2000.

References

Song recordings produced by Roy Wood
1974 songs
Songs written by Roy Wood
 1974 singles
Wizzard songs
Song recordings with Wall of Sound arrangements